Victory Party is the sixth studio album by Canadian singer-songwriter Geoff Berner, released March 8, 2011 on Mint Records. The album is influenced by the Eastern European klezmer tradition, as well as elements of punk and folk.

In the summer of 2014, Geoff Berner was touring with several musicians as the Victory Party Band, playing in locales such as Vancouver, British Columbia. Other members included Wayne Adams (drums), Brigitte Dajczer (violin) and Michael Winograd (clarinet).

Track listing

Personnel

Geoff Berner – primary artist

References 

2011 albums
Geoff Berner albums